Walk On By is an album by organist Jack McDuff recorded in 1966 and released on the Prestige label.

Reception
Allmusic awarded the album 3 stars.

Track listing 
All compositions by Jack McDuff except as indicated
 "Walk On By" (Burt Bacharach, Hal David) - 2:38   
 "Around the Corner" - 6:44   
 "Haitian Lady" (Harold Ousley) - 5:43   
 "Talkin' 'Bout My Woman" (Sidney Barnes, J. J. Jackson) - 2:15   
 "Jersey Bounce" (Tiny Bradshaw, Eddie Johnson, Bobby Plater, Buddy Feyne) - 2:30   
 "For Those Who Choose" (Ousley) - 4:09   
 "Too Many Fish in the Sea" (Eddie Holland, Norman Whitfield) - 2:17   
 "There Is No Greater Love" (Isham Jones, Marty Symes) - 5:16   
 "Song of the Soul" (Ousley) - 4:16

Personnel 
Jack McDuff - organ
Red Holloway (tracks 2 & 8), Harold Ousley (tracks 3, 6 & 9) - tenor saxophone
Pat Martino - guitar
Joe Dukes - drums
Unidentified orchestra arranged and conducted by Benny Golson (tracks 1, 4, 5 & 8)

References 

Jack McDuff albums
1966 albums
Prestige Records albums
Albums arranged by Benny Golson